The Monroe City Hall in Monroe, Utah was built in 1934. Located at 55 N. Main St., it was listed on the National Register of Historic Places in 1985. Today it houses Monroe Public Library.

The building is suggested to be of Spanish Colonial Revival style, or it might be deemed to be a Mission Revival in style.

It is a one-story building with a flat roof and a parapet.

References

City and town halls on the National Register of Historic Places in Utah
Libraries on the National Register of Historic Places in Utah
National Register of Historic Places in Sevier County, Utah
Mission Revival architecture in Utah
Buildings and structures completed in 1934
1934 establishments in Utah